Lord-lieutenants are appointed in England and Wales, Scotland, and Northern Ireland.

Lord-lieutenants

See also
Lord Lieutenant
Deputy Lieutenant
Ceremonial counties of England
Lieutenancy areas of Scotland
Preserved counties of Wales
Lists of Lord Lieutenancies
List of French prefects

Notes

External links
List of Lord Lieutenants provided by the Ministry of Justice response to a Freedom of Information Act request

01
Lord Lieutenants